Raúl Álvarez may refer to:

 AuronPlay (Raúl Álvarez Genes, born 1988), Spanish YouTuber
 Raúl Álvarez (baseball) (1902–?), Cuban baseball player